Haplology (from Greek   "simple" and  , "speech") is, in spoken language, the elision (elimination or deletion) of an entire syllable or a part of it through dissimilation (a differentiating shift that affects two neighboring similar sounds). The phenomenon was identified by American philologist Maurice Bloomfield in the 20th century. Linguists sometimes jokingly refer to the phenomenon as "haplogy". As a general rule, haplology occurs in English adverbs of adjectives ending in "le", for example gentlely → gently; ablely → ably.

Examples 
 Basque:  →  ('apple cider')
 German:  →  (female 'wizard' or 'magician'; male: der Zauberer; female ending -in); this is a productive pattern applied to other words ending in (spelt) -erer.
 Dutch:  →  ('narcissism')
 French:  →  ('femininity')
 English:
 Old English  → Engle lond → England 
 morphophonology → morphonology
 mononomial → monomial
 urine analysis → urinalysis
 Colloquial (non-standard and eye dialect spellings signalled by *):
library → *libry 
 particularly → *particuly
 probably → *probly
 February → *Febury
 representative → *representive
 authoritative → *authoritive
 Latin:
  →   ('nurse')
  →  (hence idolatry)
 Biological Latin:
 Hamamelididae (disallowed spelling: Hamamelidae)
 Nycterididae → Nycteridae
 Anomalocaridid → Anomalocarid
 Homeric Greek:  →  ('two-handled pitcher, amphora')
 Arabic:
  →  ('you are fighting each other')
  →  ('I eat')
 Italian:
 tragico-comico → tragicomico ('tragicomic')
 domani mattina → domattina ('tomorrow morning')

Reduplication 
The reverse process is known as reduplication, the doubling of phonological material.

See also
 Haplography
 Dissimilation
 Portmanteau

Notes

References
 Crowley, Terry. (1997) An Introduction to Historical Linguistics. 3rd edition. Oxford University Press.

Phonology